Microcaecilia rabei is a species of caecilian in the family Siphonopidae. It is known from Suriname and the Bolívar State in eastern Venezuela; it is likely to occur in intervening Guyana and adjacent Brazil.

Microcaecilia rabei is a subterranean species living in tropical moist environments, especially lowland rainforests. There are also records from secondary habitats. It is unlikely to be facing any significant threats, although mining could be a localized threat.

References

rabei
Amphibians of Suriname
Amphibians of Venezuela
Amphibians described in 1963
Taxonomy articles created by Polbot